Thoknia is a village in the municipality of Megalopoli, Arcadia, Greece. It is situated near the confluence of the rivers Alfeios and Elissonas, at about 360 m elevation. It was named after the ancient Arcadian city Thocnia, that was located in the area. Thoknia is 2 km east of Kato Karyes, 3 km southeast of Kyparissia, 3 km southwest of Plaka and 5 km northwest of Megalopoli. Thoknia had a population of 36 in 2011. The village is surrounded by open-pit lignite mines.

Population

History

See also
List of settlements in Arcadia

References

External links
 Thoknia on GTP Travel Pages
 Ancient Thoknia on GTP Travel Pages

Megalopolis, Greece
Populated places in Arcadia, Peloponnese